Hebron is a city in the West Bank, Palestinian territories.

Hebron may also refer to:

Places 
 Hebron (titular see), a medieval Catholic episcopal see in Hebron

Canada 
 Hebron, Newfoundland and Labrador
 Hebron, New Brunswick
 Hebron, Nova Scotia
 Hebron, Prince Edward Island
 Hebron-Ben Nevis oil field

Ghana
 Hebron, Ghana, town in Eastern Province

Palestine
 Hebron Governorate, governorate in Palestine

Spain
Vall d'Hebron, neighbourhood in Barcelona

United Kingdom 
 Hebron, Anglesey, Wales
 Hebron, Carmarthenshire, Wales
 Hebron, Northumberland, England
 Hebron railway station on the Snowdon Mountain Railway, Gwynedd, Wales

United States 
 Hebron, Connecticut
 Hebron, Illinois
 Hebron, Indiana
 Hebron, Iowa
 Hebron, Kentucky
 Hebron, Maine
 Hebron, Maryland
 Hebron (Still Pond, Maryland), listed on the NRHP
 Hebron, Missouri, in Douglas County
 Hebron, Shelby County, Missouri
 Hebron (Bethel, Missouri), listed on the NRHP
 Hebron, Nebraska
 Hebron, New Hampshire
 Hebron, New York
 Hebron, North Dakota
 Hebron, Ohio
 Hebron, Pennsylvania, in Lebanon County
 Hebron, Potter County, Pennsylvania
 Hebron, Texas
 Hebron, Utah, a ghost town
 Hebron, Marion County, West Virginia
 Hebron, Pleasants County, West Virginia
 Hebron, Wisconsin, a town
 Hebron (CDP), Wisconsin, a census-designated place within the town
 Hebron Christian Academy

Other  
Hebron (biblical figure), son of Kohath

See also 
 Hebron Yeshiva
 Hebron Academy in Hebron, Maine
 Hebron Academy (Brandon, Mississippi), listed on the NRHP in Mississippi
 Hebron Church (disambiguation)
 Hebron High School (disambiguation)
 Hebron Township (disambiguation)
 Mount Hebron (disambiguation)